December's Children (And Everybody's) is the fifth American studio album by the English rock band the Rolling Stones, released on 4 December 1965. Compiled from disparate sources across the band's recording career up to that point, including the UK version of Out of Our Heads, it features their then-recent transatlantic hit single "Get Off of My Cloud", as well as their own remake of Marianne Faithfull's Jagger/Richards-penned hit "As Tears Go By", which was released as the album's second single in the US.

Recording and music 
It is the last of the group's early albums to feature numerous cover songs; writers Mick Jagger and Keith Richards wrote only half of the songs themselves.  There had been no sessions to record the album; most of the songs were drawn from the sessions for the UK edition of Out of Our Heads in September 1965 in Los Angeles.  Many of the tracks had appeared earlier in the UK versions of Rolling Stones albums, but had been left off their American counterparts.  Other tracks were unreleased tracks that had been recorded during other recording sessions, or had been singles-only releases.  Joining core members Mick Jagger (vocals), Brian Jones (guitars), Keith Richards (guitars), Bill Wyman (bass), and Charlie Watts (drums) was former Stones member Ian Stewart on piano.  As with most of their early albums, it was produced by band manager Andrew Loog Oldham.

Title and packaging 
The title of the album came from the band's manager, Andrew Loog Oldham (who facetiously credits it to "Lou Folk-Rock Adler" in his liner notes on the back cover). According to Jagger, it was Oldham's idea of hip, Beat poetry. The front cover photo of the band, by Gered Mankowitz, had previously been used for the UK edition of Out of Our Heads.

Release and reception 

December's Children (And Everybody's) reached  in the US, where it was certified gold. Bassist Bill Wyman quotes Jagger in 1968 calling the record "[not] an album, it's just a collection of songs." Accordingly, it is only briefly detailed in Wyman's otherwise exhaustive book Rolling with the Stones.  The group's second US , Get Off of My Cloud, was the highest-charting single on the album, also a major chart topper in the band's native UK and several other markets.

In August 2002, the album was reissued in a new remastered CD and SACD digipak by ABKCO Records. "Look What You've Done" remains the album's only cut issued in true stereo.

Track listing

Recording sessions
Most of the songs were recorded 5–6 September 1965 at the RCA Records studio in Hollywood, California, except:
"You Better Move On" – 8 August 1963, Decca Studios, London
"Look What You've Done" – 11 June 1964, Chess Records studio, Chicago
"Route 66" and "I'm Moving On" – 5–7 March 1965, live performances, England
"As Tears Go By" – 26 October 1965, IBC Studios, London

Personnel
The Rolling Stones
Mick Jagger – lead vocals , backing vocals , tambourine 
Keith Richards – electric guitar , acoustic guitar , backing vocals , co-lead vocals 
Brian Jones – electric guitar , acoustic guitar , slide guitar , harmonica , organ , backing vocals 
Bill Wyman – bass guitar , backing vocals 
Charlie Watts – drums 

Additional personnel
Ian Stewart – piano 
Mike Leander – string arrangement

Charts

Certifications

References

1965 albums
ABKCO Records albums
Albums produced by Andrew Loog Oldham
London Records albums
The Rolling Stones albums